National Enameling and Stamping Company is a historic factory complex located at Baltimore, Maryland, United States. It was constructed in 1887 to serve as the works of the Baltimore branch of the nation's largest tinware manufacturer, the National Enameling and Stamping Company (NESCO). The densely packed complex fills an almost  site and consists of 17 interconnected buildings and one structure that vary in height from one to five stories. The complex was organized to house three primary functions in discrete sections: the manufacture of tinware, the manufacture of enameled and japanned wares, and storage, warehousing, and distribution. The plant ceased production of tinware and enameled wares in 1952.

NESCO owner George Worth Knapp lived nearby at the Hilton estate and dairy farm near Catonsville, Maryland purchased in 1917.

National Enameling and Stamping Company was listed on the National Register of Historic Places in 2002.

References

External links 
, including photo from 2002, at Maryland Historical Trust

Buildings and structures in Baltimore
Industrial buildings and structures on the National Register of Historic Places in Baltimore
Industrial buildings completed in 1887
South Baltimore, Baltimore